Mount Surat is a mountain in Dukes County, Massachusetts, Massachusetts. Mount Cary is located southwest of Mount Surat.

References

Mountains of Massachusetts
Mountains of Dukes County, Massachusetts